Alphonsus "Fonse" John Carroll (20 April 1895 in Mataura – 1 December 1974 in Palmerston North) was a New Zealand dual-code international rugby union and rugby league footballer who played in the 1920s, who represented New Zealand in both codes. He played at both Prop and Hooker.

Early years
Carroll was born in Mataura on 20 April 1895 before moving to the Manawatu with his family. He was the youngest of five brothers who represented Manawatu in rugby union. Carroll was a conscientious objector during World War I. In his early years Carroll was a race horse trainer, however one of his best horses broke down following the New Zealand Grand National in 1916.

Rugby union career
Carroll began playing rugby union aged 22 in 1917 for the Jackeytown club and first represented Manawatu in 1919. Carroll was also selected for the North Island in 1919.

Carroll played in 8 games for the All Blacks, being a part of the 1920 tour of Australia, but never played in a Test match. Carroll scored 3 tries and 2 conversions for the All Blacks, totaling 13 points. He played for the combined Manawatu-Horowhenua team against the touring South African side in 1921. Carroll continued to play for Manawatu until 1924.

Rugby league career
On September 13, just 2 weeks after playing in Manawatu's first ever Ranfurly Shield Challenge against Hawke's Bay Carroll switched codes and played for Manawatu against Wellington at Foxton. Carroll scored a try in the match which was drawn 14-14. Interviewed after the game he said "there was no loafing in the lineout, but one had to be going all the time" and "intimated the code had come to stay in Manawatu so far as he was concerned".

In 1925 Carroll 'moved' to Wellington, representing the province. Carroll was in fact driving to Wellington from Palmerston North each weekend to play for Newtown. During the season he was selected to play for the North Island team against the South Island. The North won 27-9 in front of 4,000 at Carlaw Park. From this match he was selected to play for New Zealand on their tour of Australia where he played 9 matches and scored 2 tries. His one and only match for the full Wellington side (he played in 3 trial matches across his 2 seasons), was against Auckland B at Newtown Park. Wellington were thrashed 68 to 9.

Carroll played in two Tests for the New Zealand Kiwis, touring Australia in 1926 and being part of the 1926–27 tour of Great Britain where he played against England at Central Park, Wigan on 2 October 1926. The tour was marred by strike action by the forwards and Carroll was one of the seven players sent home. As a result, he was banned for life by the New Zealand Rugby League – a ban which was lifted in 1962.

Later years
Carroll attempted to return to rugby union but his application was refused by the New Zealand Rugby Union in 1930. He participated in some "low level" coaching and was eventually reinstated in 1967, at the time of the NZRFU's 75th jubilee.

Carroll owned a dairy farm in and was an active member of the Labour Party. His farm was the venue for the local Snake Valley cricket team for 40 years.

Two of Carroll's sons, Joe and Jim, represented Manawatu between 1965–68 and 1972–83 respectively.

References

External links

1895 births
1974 deaths
Dual-code rugby internationals
New Zealand conscientious objectors
New Zealand farmers
New Zealand international rugby union players
New Zealand Labour Party politicians
New Zealand national rugby league team players
New Zealand rugby league players
New Zealand rugby union coaches
New Zealand rugby union players
North Island rugby union players
People from Mataura
Rugby league hookers
Rugby league props
Rugby union hookers
Rugby union props
Wellington rugby league team players
20th-century New Zealand politicians